Marmot is an outdoor recreation clothing and sporting goods company founded in 1974 as "Marmot Mountain Works". The company was founded in Grand Junction, Colorado by local resident Tom Boyce and two University of California, Santa Cruz students, David Huntley and Eric Reynolds, who shared the common goal of making their own mountaineering equipment. Two years prior to the founding of Marmot, Boyce secured an order for the climbing apparel used in the film The Eiger Sanction starring Clint Eastwood, and Huntley made the original prototype gear that Boyce was using on the Wolper Productions/National Geographic documentary Journey to the Outer Limits, about the Colorado Outward Bound School. It was during this documentary production that cameraman Mike Hoover, who later worked on Eiger Sanction, saw the equipment that Boyce was using during the portion filmed in Peru. Just prior to Christmas 1973, Mike Hoover called Boyce and placed the order that led to the formation of the company in Grand Junction.

After Jarden was acquired by Newell Rubbermaid in 2016, Marmot was spun off from K2 and K2 Sports was sold to Kohlberg & Company in 2017. Marmot stayed with Newell.

History  

In 1976, Marmot ventured on another new business opportunity when Eric Reynolds met Joe Tanner of W. L. Gore & Associates. Within a couple of weeks, Marmot had sewn prototype sleeping bags using the then-new Gore-Tex fabric for field testing. Reynolds and Huntley spent seven nights in a commercial frozen meat locker comparing bags with and without the Gore-Tex fabric, as well as testing the bags under fire sprinklers. They were impressed by what they saw and changed everything in the Marmot line to Gore-Tex fabrications.

Now based in Rohnert Park, California, Marmot is globally distributed and part of the Newell Brands.

References

External links 
 

Newell Brands
Sporting goods retailers of the United States
Clothing retailers of the United States
Camping equipment manufacturers
Climbing and mountaineering equipment companies
Marmot
Manufacturing companies based in California
Retail companies based in California
Rohnert Park, California
American companies established in 1974
Clothing companies established in 1974
Manufacturing companies established in 1974
Retail companies established in 1974
Companies that filed for Chapter 11 bankruptcy in 1993
Companies based in Sonoma County, California
1974 establishments in California